Aerosport OY is an Estonian aircraft manufacturer based in Keila. The company specializes in the design and manufacture of powered parachutes and paramotors in the form of ready-to-fly aircraft for the US FAR 103 Ultralight Vehicles rules and the European Fédération Aéronautique Internationale microlight category.

The company produces lines of both powered parachutes and paramotors that are noted for their wide choice of engine, propeller and reduction drive combinations.

Aircraft

References

External links

Aircraft manufacturers of Estonia
Ultralight aircraft
Powered parachutes
Paramotors
Estonian brands